Naft Maysan SC (also known as Naft Missan) is an Iraqi professional football club based in Amarah, Maysan that competes in the Iraqi Premier League, the top flight of football in Iraq.

History
Naft Maysan Sports Club was founded in 2003 by the Ministry of Oil. In 2009–10 season, the club was playing in the Iraqi Premier League until it relegated to Iraq Division One in the 2011 season. But the team returned to play in the Iraqi Premier League after winning the runner-up in the 2012–13 Iraq Division One where it remains.

Oil Minister's Cup
In addition to the club's participation in the Iraqi Premier League and Iraq FA Cup, the club participates in the “ Oil Minister's Cup “ championship with the clubs belonging to the Ministry of Oil periodically.

Current squad

First-team squad

Current technical staff

{| class="toccolours"
!bgcolor=silver|Position
!bgcolor=silver|Name
!bgcolor=silver|Nationality
|- bgcolor=#eeeeee
|Manager:||Uday Ismail||
|-
|Assistant manager:||Shafiq Jabal||
|- bgcolor=#eeeeee
|Assistant manager:||Ashraf ben Razzaq||
|- 
|-bgcolor=#eeeeee
|Goalkeeping coach:||Ahmed Abdul Ridha||
|-
|Director of football:||Hamid Kareem||
|- bgcolor=#eeeeee
| Administrative director:||Ali Dawoud||
|-
|Team analyst:||Ramadan Al-Zubaidy||
|- bgcolor=#eeeeee
| Club doctor:||Aboud Hameed||
|-
|U-16 Manager:||Sattar Shet||
|-

Managerial history

  Ahmed Salim 
  Ahmed Daham 
  Hussein Afash 
  Sabah Abdul Jalil 
  Asaad Abdul Razzaq 
  Hassan Ahmed 
  Abbas Obeid 
  Ahmed Daham 
  Uday Ismail 
  Ahmed Daham 
  Razzaq Farhan 
  Uday Ismail 
  Thair Jassam 
  Asaad Abdul Razzaq 
  Ahmed Khalaf 
  Uday Ismail

Records

Statistics 
The season-by-season performance of the club over the recent years:

All-time top goalscorers

Players in bold are still available for selection.

Honours
Iraq Division One
Winners (1): 2008–09 (shared)

References

External links
 Club page on Goalzz

2003 establishments in Iraq
Association football clubs established in 2003
Football clubs in Maysan